The Age of Innocence is a greatest hits album by Taiwanese singer Jolin Tsai. It was released on March 27, 2003, by Universal and D Sound. It contains her 30 songs previously released by Universal.

Background and release 
In March 1999, Tsai signed a recording contract with Universal, through which she later released four studio albums—1019 (1999), Don't Stop (2000), Show Your Love (2000), and Lucky Number (2001), the four albums have sold more than 450,000, 500,000, 280,000, and 150,000 copies in Taiwan, respectively. On November 6, 2001, Universal released for Tsai the greatest hits album, Together. On April 2, 2002, Universal released for Tsai the remix album, Dance Collection.

On July 23, 2002, Tsai signed a recording contract with Sony. On May 14, 2003, Universal released for Tsai another greatest hits album named The Age of Innocence, which contains her 30 songs previously released by the label. It peaked at number 14 on the weekly album sales chart of G-Music in Taiwan.

Critical reception 
Tencent Entertainment's Shuwa commented: "This double-CD greatest hits album was released seven days after the release of Magic, which was released after Jolin Tsai joined Sony. The double-CD greatest hits album features works as many as 30 songs, which means almost all of Jolin Tsai's works during the Universal period have been included. This is the first work released by Jolin Tsai's old label that competed sales with the album released by her new label."

Track listing

Release history

References 

2003 greatest hits albums
Jolin Tsai compilation albums
Universal Music Taiwan compilation albums